Sir William Bisset (William Byset/Bissett) was a knight, sheriff and constable in the 13th and 14th centuries.
 
William was the son of Robert Bisset of Upsettlington and Christiana. He swore fealty to King Edward I of England in 1296. Issued with a safe passage through England to return to Scotland, to prepare for the 1297 expedition to Flanders. While he was in Flanders, his castle of Upsettlington  was sacked and destroyed. William fought on the side of the English in the Battle of Falkirk on the 22 July 1298, where the Scots were defeated. He was the Sheriff of Clackmannan between 1303-1304 and Sheriff of Stirling between 1304-1305 and Constable of Stirling Castle between 1305 and 1307 during the Wars of Scottish Independence, remaining loyal to King Edward I of England.

Citations and references
Citations

References

Year of birth uncertain
Year of death uncertain
13th-century Scottish judges
Scottish knights
Scottish sheriffs
William
Scottish people of the Wars of Scottish Independence
People from the Scottish Borders
14th-century Scottish judges